Leslie Joan Baier is an American scientist. She is a senior investigator in diabetes molecular genetics at the National Institute of Diabetes and Digestive and Kidney Diseases.

Education 
Baier completed a bachelor of arts from Lawrence University in 1982. She earned a Ph.D. from University of Michigan in 1990. Her doctoral advisor was Gary Nabel. Baier's dissertation was titled Isolation and characterization of a human dna binding protein which contains an antp homeobox sequence.

Career and research 
Baier is a senior investigator in the Diabetes Molecular Genetics Section of the Phoenix Epidemiology and Clinical Research Branch at the National Institute of Diabetes and Digestive and Kidney Diseases. The purpose of Baier's research is to identify the heritable basis for type 2 diabetes and obesity among Pima people. Understanding and quantifying specific genetically determined susceptibility factors could lead to prevention by identifying individuals at risk for these diseases. The research could also identify novel therapeutic and personalized targets, which may lead to treatment improvements.

References 

Living people
Year of birth missing (living people)
Lawrence University alumni
University of Michigan alumni
National Institutes of Health people
20th-century American scientists
21st-century American scientists
20th-century American women scientists
21st-century American women scientists